Gustavo Henrique Ferrareis (born 2 January 1996), known as Gustavo Ferrareis or just Ferrareis, is a Brazilian professional footballer who plays as either an attacking midfielder or a forward for Liga MX club Puebla.

Club career
Born in Lençóis Paulista, São Paulo, Ferrareis is a youth exponent from Internacional. He made his first team – and Série A – debut on 29 November 2014, coming on as a second-half substitute for goalscorer Taiberson in a 3–1 home win against Palmeiras.

Ferrareis was definitely promoted to the main squad ahead of the 2016 season, and scored his first senior goal on 8 May of that year in a 3–0 Campeonato Gaúcho home success over Juventude. His first top tier goal came on 25 September, but in a 3–1 away loss against Atlético Mineiro; he finished the year with two goals in 24 league appearances, as his side was relegated for the first time ever.

Honours
Internacional
Campeonato Gaúcho: 2016

Figueirense
Campeonato Catarinense: 2018

References

External links
 
 

1996 births
Living people
Footballers from São Paulo (state)
Brazilian footballers
Association football midfielders
Association football forwards
Campeonato Brasileiro Série A players
Campeonato Brasileiro Série B players
Sport Club Internacional players
Esporte Clube Bahia players
Figueirense FC players
Botafogo de Futebol e Regatas players
Avaí FC players
Atlético Clube Goianiense players
Club Puebla players